Divri (Greek: Δίβρη) may refer to:

Divri, Phthiotis, a village in the municipality of Lamia, Phthiotis, Greece
the former name for Lampeia, northeastern Elis, Greece
the Greek name for Dhivër, Sarandë District, Albania
the Greek name for Debar, western Macedonia